Longley is a rural residential locality in the local government area of Kingborough in the Hobart region of Tasmania. The 2016 census has a population of 234 for the state suburb of Longley.

History
Longley was gazetted as a locality in 1970. The name has been used for the area since 1879, probably named for an early settler.

Geography
The Huon Highway (A6) forms the southern and much of the western boundaries.

Road infrastructure
The B64 route (Huon Road / Sandfly Road) enters from the east and runs south-west and south to the southern boundary, where it ends at an intersection with A6.

References

Localities of Kingborough Council
Towns in Tasmania